Lucas Emmanuel Pérez Godoy (born 30 June 1993) is an Argentine professional footballer who plays as a midfielder for Deportivo Madryn.

Career
Pérez Godoy began his career with Quilmes. After making his senior debut on 5 March 2013 in the Copa Argentina against Ferrocarril Midland, Pérez Godoy went on to score against River Plate and Gimnasia y Esgrima (LP) across twenty-nine appearances in the 2013–14 Argentine Primera División. He stayed for three more seasons, featuring a total of sixty-one times for the club whilst scoring three goals. Fellow top-flight team Sarmiento signed Pérez Godoy on 24 August 2016. One goal, in April 2017 versus River Plate, in ten games came in 2016–17. Pérez Godoy spent six months with Primera B Nacional side Brown to end 2017.

On 24 January 2018, Pérez Godoy joined UAI Urquiza of Primera B Metropolitana. Twelve appearances followed. Six months after joining, Pérez Godoy departed to seal a return to Primera B Nacional with Mitre in June. His bow for them arrived on 26 August during a victory away to Platense. Spells with Deportivo Morón, in July 2019, and Chacarita Juniors, in August 2020, occurred across the following few years; the latter came after a move to Gimnasia y Esgrima (M) fell through.

Career statistics
.

References

External links

1993 births
Living people
People from Lomas de Zamora
Argentine footballers
Association football midfielders
Argentine Primera División players
Primera Nacional players
Primera B Metropolitana players
Quilmes Atlético Club footballers
Club Atlético Sarmiento footballers
Club Atlético Brown footballers
UAI Urquiza players
Club Atlético Mitre footballers
Deportivo Morón footballers
Chacarita Juniors footballers
Gimnasia y Esgrima de Jujuy footballers
Club Atlético Atlanta footballers
Deportivo Madryn players
Sportspeople from Buenos Aires Province